The 2017 BWF World Championships of badminton were held from 21 to 27 August at the Emirates Arena in Glasgow, Scotland.

The venue can hold 6,000 spectators. When Glasgow hosted the event in 1997 it was held at the Scotstoun Centre.

Host city selection
Glasgow originally submitted a bid for the 2017 Sudirman Cup but lost to Gold Coast. The Badminton World Federation awarded the World Championships to Glasgow after the event did not receive appropriate bids.

Schedule
All times are local (UTC+1).

Medal summary

Medal table

Medalists

References

External links
Official website

 
2017
World Championships
BWF World Championships
2017 BWF World Championships
2017 BWF World Championships
August 2017 sports events in the United Kingdom